Geogepa monticola is a species of moth of the family Tortricidae. It is found on the island of Honshu in Japan. The habitat consists of subalpine and alpine forests.

The length of the forewings is 6.5–8.5 mm in males and 7–8.5 mm in females. The ground colour of the forewings is light greyish ochreous, with weak fuscous reticulation (net-like lines) and deep reddish-brown markings. The hindwings are light grey with a slight brownish hue. There is one generation per year.

References

Moths described in 2004
Archipini